Happy Valley is a British (BBC) crime drama television series that is set and filmed in the Calder Valley. The series stars Sarah Lancashire and Siobhan Finneran, and features a main and recurring cast.

Overview

Main cast and characters
 Sarah Lancashire as Catherine Cawood; a Halifax Police Sergeant. 
 Siobhan Finneran as Clare Cartwright; Catherine's sister, who is a recovering heroin and alcohol addict.
 James Norton as Tommy Lee Royce; a drug-offender and the father of Catherine's grandson, Ryan.
 Charlie Murphy as Ann Gallagher; a kidnap victim who later becomes a Police Community Support Officer.
 George Costigan as Nevison Gallagher; a successful businessman and Ann's father.
 Karl Davies as Daniel Cawood (Series 2-3; recurring Series 1); Catherine's son, and later Ann's partner.
 Rick Warden as Inspector Mike Taylor (Series 2-3; recurring Series 1); Catherine's supervisor.
 Vincent Franklin (Series 2-3) as Detective Superintendent Andy Shepherd; the Head of the Murder Squad for Halifax Police.
 Con O'Neill as Neil Ackroyd (Series 2-3); an old friend of Clare, and later her partner.
 Susan Lynch as Alison Garrs (Series 2-3); Daryl's mother.
Rhys Connah as Ryan Cawood (Series 3; recurring Series 1-2); Tommy's son and Catherine's grandson.

Series 1
 Steve Pemberton as Kevin Weatherill; Nevison Gallagher's accountant. 
 Joe Armstrong as Ashley Cowgill; a drug-dealing property developer.
 Adam Long as Lewis Whippey; an employee of Ashley.

Series 2
 Shirley Henderson as Frances Drummond; Ryan's teaching assistant, and an infatuated admirer of Tommy.
 Kevin Doyle as John Wadsworth; a Detective Sergeant (DS) with a troubled home-life.
 Katherine Kelly as Jodie Shackleton; a Police Detective Inspector (DI) assigned to Halifax Major Incident Team.
 Robert Emms as Daryl Garrs; a bullied and disturbed young farmer.
 Matthew Lewis as Sean Balmforth; a murder suspect.
 Julie Hesmondhalgh as Amanda Wadsworth; John's newly estranged wife.
 Amelia Bullmore as Vicky Fleming; John's mistress

Series 3
 Mollie Winnard as Joanna Hepworth, who is addicted to prescription medication and being abused by her husband.
 Mark Stanley as Rob Hepworth, as Ryan's PE teacher, who is abusing his wife Joanna.
 Amit Shah  as Faisal Bhatti, local pharmacist who is supplying Joanna with drugs in exchange for sex.
 Emily Barnett as Becky Cawood, Catherine’s Daughter and Ryan’s Mother.

Recurring cast and characters
Shane Zaza as Shafiq Shah: a Police Constable (Series 1 & 2) Police Sergeant (Series 3).
Ishia Bennison as Joyce: a civilian police employee. 
Jill Baker as Helen Gallagher: Nevison's wife. 
Ramon Tikaram as Praveen Badal: the Yorkshire Police District Commander.
Olwen May as Mrs Beresford: Headmistress at Ryan’s School.

Series 1

Series 2

Series 3

References

Happy Valley